The men's K-1 1000 metres sprint canoeing competition at the 2002 Asian Games in Busan was held on 10 October at the Nakdong River.

Schedule
All times are Korea Standard Time (UTC+09:00)

Results

References 

2002 Asian Games Official Reports, Page 345
Results

External links 
Official Website

Men's K-1 1000 metres